Fort Santa Isabel, also known as Taytay Fort, is a coastal fortification in the town of Taytay of Palawan, Philippines.

History

Background
Fort Santa Isabel was originally built in 1667 as a wooden palisade under the Augustinian Recollect priests. It was named in honor of Isabella II of Spain.

Through the efforts of Governor General Fernando Manuel de Bustillo, the structure was replaced in 1738 by a coral limestone fort and was primarily used by the Spanish as a defensive structure against Muslim raiders.

2018–2019 restoration
The municipal government of Taytay, with help from the National Historical Commission, commenced renovation works on the fort in 2018 as part of its Estrella del Norte Heritage Development Project. The project, led by heritage architect Joel Rico, was set to be finished by May 1, 2019.

Gallery

References

Spanish Colonial Fortifications of the Philippines
Buildings and structures in Palawan